Charlotte Lehmann (born 3 October 1906, date of death unknown) was a German freestyle swimmer, born in Dresden, who competed in the 1928 Summer Olympics.

In 1928 she finished fourth with the German relay team in the 4×100 metre freestyle relay competition. In the 100 metre freestyle event she finished sixth. She also participated  in the 400 metre freestyle competition but was eliminated in the first round.

External links

1906 births
Year of death missing
Swimmers from Dresden
Olympic swimmers of Germany
Swimmers at the 1928 Summer Olympics
European Aquatics Championships medalists in swimming
German female freestyle swimmers